The Former Residence of Lei Feng or Lei Feng's Former Residence was the birthplace and childhood home of Lei Feng, a soldier of the Chinese army in Communist legend. The residence is located in Leifeng Subdistrict of Wangcheng District, in northwestern Changsha, South Central China's Hunan province. It is currently an immensely popular tourist attraction in Hunan.

History
The 12-room residence was built in the late Qing Dynasty during the Guangxu Era, and was formerly owned by a local landlord Tansi Gunzi. 

On December 18, 1940, Lei Feng was born in this residence. He lived there until November 1956, when he was transferred to Wangcheng County as a civil servant.

In 1958, the Residence was demolished because of significant disrepair. Lei's uncle, Lei Guangming, then built a three-room house on its original site.

In the winter of 1966, the Hunan Provincial Government began to construct the Lei Feng Memorial near the residence. It was completed on November 20, 1968.

In 1993, the local government renovated the residence, and in the same year it was officially opened to the public. In January 2011, it was designated as a provincial-level key cultural heritage site.

Architecture

Statue of Lei Feng
The  Statue of Lei Feng wears military uniform with a gun on his back, stands in the Lei Feng Statue Square. The statue was made of granite by sculptor Zhu Weijing. In May 2002, it was classified as a provincial key cultural unit.

Lei Feng Memorial
The Lei Feng Memorial construction took two years, 1966 -1968. On October 29, 1990, Jiang Zemin, General Secretary of the Communist Party of China, titled the site Lei Feng Memorial. In 2002, it has been categorized as a 4A level tourist site by the China National Tourism Administration.

Transportation
 Take bus No. W202-1, 315 or 913 to Lei Feng Bus Stop
 Take bus No. W203, W211, or 916 to Lei Feng Memorial Bus Stop

References

External links

Buildings and structures in Changsha
Wangcheng District
Traditional folk houses in Hunan
Tourist attractions in Changsha
Historical and Cultural Sites Protected at the Provincial Level in Hunan